Handroanthus serratifolius is a species of tree, commonly known as yellow lapacho, pau d'arco, yellow poui, yellow ipe, pau d'arco amarelo, or ipê-amarelo.

Description

It is a tree native to forests throughout Central and South America. This plant grows in the cerrado vegetation of Brazil, reaching up to French Guiana, Bolivia, Paraguay and Northern Argentina. 

Uses
It is a commercially farmed hardwood notable for its extreme hardness and resistance to fire and pests. It is sometimes traded as an "ironwood", or just as "ipê" (the entire genus Tabebuia), or as lapacho (properly Handroanthus serratifolius)

Chemistry
The bark of Handroanthus serratifolius contains chemical compounds including lapachol, quercetin, and other flavonoids.

National Flower of Brazil
The national flower of Brazil is the ipe-amarelo. The ipe-amarelo is actually a flowering tree that blooms in bright yellow flowers during the months of September and October. Blooms only last about a week.

References

External links

serratifolius
Trees of Central America
Trees of South America
Trees of Brazil
Trees of Bolivia
Trees of Colombia
Trees of Ecuador
Trees of Peru
Trees of Guyana
Trees of Suriname
Trees of Venezuela
Trees of Trinidad and Tobago
Trees of French Guiana
Flora of the Cerrado
Medicinal plants of South America
Trees of Panama